Suwardi (born 19 May 1947) is an Indonesian justice who is the third Deputy Chief Justice of the Supreme Court of Indonesia for non-judicial affairs. He was elected to the position by a vote of his 47 peers on the court in 2013, earning 27 votes versus the 19 of his predecessor Ahmad Kamil.

References

1947 births
Living people
People from Metro (city)